Eyes Beyond Seeing is a 1995 spiritual drama film. Many scenes were filmed at the Kings Park Psychiatric Center on Long Island.

Plot
An enigmatic, homeless mental patient (Cobb) who claims to be the second coming of Jesus Christ has been committed once again. He begins to suffer asylum life. Despite this, he befriends his psychiatrist who has lost his faith, and the man manages to change the psychiatrist's life.

References

External links 
 

American drama films
1995 drama films
1995 films
1990s English-language films
1990s American films